Chiatura is a district of Georgia, in the region of Imereti. Its main town is Chiatura.

Population: 39,884 (2014 census)

Area: 542 km2

Demography

Politics 
Chiatura Municipal Assembly (Georgian: ჭიათურის საკრებულო) is a representative body in Chiatura Municipality, consisting of 36 members and elected every four years. The last election was held in October 2021.

Gallery

See also 
 List of municipalities in Georgia (country)

References

External links 
 Districts of Georgia, Statoids.com

Municipalities of Imereti